The COVID-19 pandemic in Portugal is part of the pandemic of coronavirus disease 2019 caused by severe acute respiratory syndrome coronavirus 2. On 2 March 2020, the virus was confirmed to have reached the country when it was reported that two men, a 60-year-old doctor who travelled to the north of Italy on vacation and a 33-year-old man working in Spain, tested positive for COVID-19. On 16 March 2020, the first death from COVID-19 was reported in Portugal.

On 11 October 2020, the number of confirmed cases in Portugal exceeded the number of confirmed cases in China. On 19 October 2020, the number of confirmed cases in the country crossed the 100,000-mark. The number of confirmed cases in Portugal also crossed the 200,000-mark on 13 November 2020, the 300,000-mark at the beginning of December 2020, the 400,000-mark on 29 December 2020, the 500,000-mark on 13 January 2021, the 600,000-mark on 22 January 2021, the 700,000-mark on 30 January 2021, the 800,000-mark on 22 February 2021, the 900,000-mark on 9 July 2021 and the one-million-mark on 14 August 2021. On 2 March 2021, the first anniversary of the COVID-19 pandemic in the country was commemorated. It was six days after the number of confirmed cases in Portugal exceeded 800,000.

As of 24 October 2021, Portugal administered about 16.6 million doses; over 9 million people had received at least 1 dose and over 8.86 million people were fully vaccinated, 87% and 86% of eligible population, respectively.

The country is currently undergoing a fifth wave of the pandemic. That situation was announced by the DGS in November 2021.

Background 
On 12 January 2020, the World Health Organization (WHO) confirmed that a novel coronavirus was the cause of a respiratory illness in a cluster of people in Wuhan City, Hubei Province, China, which was reported to the WHO on 31 December 2019.

The case fatality ratio for COVID-19 has been much lower than SARS of 2003, but the transmission has been significantly greater, with a significant total death toll.

Timeline

2020

March 
 March 2: The first two  recorded cases of COVID-19 confirmed in Portugal.
 March 12: The Portuguese government declared the highest level of alert because of COVID-19 and said it would be maintained until 9 April. Portugal entered a Mitigation Phase as Community transmission was detected.
 March 18: The President of the Republic, Marcelo Rebelo de Sousa, declared the entirety of the Portuguese territory in a State of Emergency for the following fifteen days, with the possibility of renewal, the first since the Carnation Revolution in 1974.
 March 24: The Portuguese Government admitted that the country could not contain the virus any longer.
 March 26: The country entered the "Mitigation Stage". The health care sites dedicated to fighting the disease started including the Portugal Health centres groups (agrupamentos de centros de saúde, ACES).

April 
 April 2: The Parliament approved the extension of the State of Emergency, as requested by the President. The State of Emergency will remain until 17 April, subject to further extensions of similar duration. Under the new regulations, for the Easter traditions, from 9 April (Maundy Thursday) to 13 April (Easter Monday) the Portuguese Government decreed special measures in restricting people movements between municipalities (Portuguese: municípios or concelhos) with very few exceptions, closing all airports to civil transportation and increased control in the national borders.
 April 30: The Portuguese Ministers' Council approved a plan to start releasing the country from the COVID-19 container measures and cancelling the State of Emergency.

May 
 May 2: The State of Emergency was canceled.
 May 4: Portugal started the first phase in easing restrictions. Small street stores reopened (see Response, Return to Normal section).
 May 18: Portugal entered the second phase in easing restrictions. Nurseries and the last two years of the secondary school reopened, along with restaurants, cafés, medium-sized street stores and some museums, all with mandatory usage of mask and distance rules.

September 
 September 15:  "state of alert" to nationwide "state of contingency". The decision is thought to prepare the country for the return of students and teachers for the new academic year, the return of workers into the workplace from months of work-from-home policies and for the possible surge of new cases due to the beginning of fall and winter. The following measures were adopted:

 Mandatory domiciliary or hospital confinement for people infected with COVID-19 or subject to active health surveillance. 
 Prohibition of gatherings with more than 10 people.
 Prohibition of the consumption of alcoholic beverages in public areas.
 Prohibition of sales of alcoholic beverages in service areas and gas stations.
 General commercial establishments have to be closed at 8 p.m.
 Supermarkets can remain open until 10 p.m, however the sale of alcoholic beverages after 8 p.m is prohibited.
 Restaurants can remain open beyond 8 p.m for local consumption (both in the interior of the commercial establishment or on the outside, where permitted) and for take-away services and home delivery.
 Closing time for the following establishments were not fixed: gas stations (which can remain open 24 hours per day exclusively for the sale of fuel), pharmacies, funeral homes, sports establishments, clinics and medical establishments.

October 
 October 14 : Government declares "state of calamity" due to surge in new cases.

2021

January 
 January 15 : Government reinstates nationwide lockdown due to a surge in new cases.
 January 17 : Portugal registers the highest number of coronavirus cases in Europe per capita over the last seven days, according to Oxford University's ourworldindata.org. 
 January 21 : Government declares closure of all schools, kindergartens and universities for at least 15 days. The decision was motivated by the increase in infections caused by the UK SARS-CoV-2 variant. 
January 22: Catholic bishops decide to discontinue the public celebration of Masses, Baptisms, Confirmations, marriages, and other pastoral activities, as of January 23. The Shrine of Our Lady of Fátima has been negatively impacted by the pandemic measures.
January 23: Portugal registers record number of daily cases (15,333) and the highest number of people in intensive care units (720) since the beginning of the pandemic. Death toll passes the 10,000 mark (10,194).
January 26: Portugal registers record number of daily deaths (291).

March 
 March 11 : The country launches its second time lockdown for a month.  There are now a totaling 813,152 confirmed cases, 16,650 deaths since the pandemic broke out and 793,162 people have taken the vaccination.
April

 Portugal is back to lockdown for the second time since 15 Jan 2021.
 April 22, health authorities reported that the country has a total of 833,397 confirmed cases with 16,957 deaths.

November 
November 29, it was announced 13 cases of the Omicron coronavirus variant were detected amongst players and staff of top division Lisbon soccer club Belenenses SAD.

December 
December 1, health authorities ordered all members of Portuguese soccer club C.D. Tondela to go into isolation following a new surge in coronavirus cases in the country.

Response

Information access 
Information about the ongoing COVID-19 pandemic in the country is hosted on the DGS home website. However, due to the severity of the pandemic a separate website was created dedicated specifically to coronavirus information and updates under the Portuguese Ministry of Health. Another governmental website was later created to deal with more generic information explaining the emergency status, public information and exceptional measures to help business.

The Ministry of Health provides a web page with information for the public about different areas, including brochures, orientation and guidance for different activity sectors, how to deal with self-isolation, and quarantine games for children. As an example there are several Portuguese food recipes with canned food.

Hospitals for COVID-19 
The following is a list of the front line COVID-19 hospitals.

Fiscal Policy Response 
In 2020, Portugal allocated €600 million per month to financial support for workers furloughed by their employers. Roughly €1.3 billion were allocated to incentivize a gradual reopening and return to economic activity, and €13 billion in lines of credit were extended to small and mid-size businesses. Tax and Social Security Contribution deferrals totaling €7.9 billion for companies and employees were enacted. The APOIAR Program was introduced, extending €.8 billion in loans to small businesses. As of March 12, an additional €296 million were allocated to improving the capacity of the National Health System.

The 2021 budget includes extension of support for businesses, including assistance with non-housing rents for some firms, with subsidies of up to 50% of rent being granted. Large companies in sectors of the economy hurt by the pandemic, namely the tourism sector, received €750 billion in loans and subsidies. On August 2, 2021, support available for businesses forced to remain closed via the APOIAR program was increased, with small businesses whose income declined by more than 50% being eligible for €41,250 in financial support. Moreover, a moratorium on repayment of business loans lasting six months was enacted, and subsequently extended until September 2021. In April, Portugal presented the Recovery and Resiliency Plan to the European commission, including €14 billion in grants and €2.7 billion in loans. The European Commission approved Portugal's Recovery and Resilience plan, adopting a positive assessment of the plan. As of May, the Portuguese government has announced a €6 billion plan to reactivate the tourism industry.

Return to normal 

On April 30, 2020, the Portuguese Ministers' Council approved a plan to start releasing the country from COVID-19 containment measures and cancel the State of Emergency. The plan was divided in three stages, beginning respectively on 4 May, 24 May and 1 June 2020.

The first stage eased some restrictions, such as:
 Barbers and hair salons are open but with health restrictions, mask usage and only by appointment
 Small shops with less than 200m2 can open but cannot have more than 5 customers/100m2 and all must use masks
 People can use public transportation if they are not able to work remotely. Transport vehicles can only be filled to two thirds capacity and all passengers must use a mask
 All public services are open to everyone with an appointment and is an obligation the use of a mask
 Physical exercise can only be done outdoors or at home
 Libraries and Archives are open
 Groups of more than 10 people are not allowed

Impact 

Due to movement restrictions imposed by the state of emergency started in March 18 and the adoption of government guidelines on social distancing by the Portuguese people, otherwise highly populated streets and destinations in cities like Lisbon and Porto were completely empty.

LGBT+ youth 
A study by the Faculdade de Psicologia e de Ciências da Educação da Universidade do Porto (FPCEUP) aimed at "assessing the psychological health and social support networks" of LGBT+ young people who live with their parental figures during the COVID-19 pandemic concluded, based on a survey of 632 young LGBT+ people, who most did not feel comfortable in their families during confinement.

Of the people surveyed, 59% said they were uncomfortable in the family and three out of 10 felt "quite uncomfortable" living at home with parents during social confinement.

In addition, 35% of young people felt "suffocated" because they were unable to express their identity within the family, whereas in the case of young people whose family was aware of their identity, 35% stated that they "deal badly or very badly" thereby.

This study, with a longitudinal and intercultural character, also concluded that six out of 10 participants considered that the pandemic had "greatly" affected their lives.

With regard to social support networks, half of the young people admitted to feeling isolated from their friends and 35% "extremely isolated" from their partners.

"As for the present study, if for some young people the covid-19 pandemic had no impact on their social support networks, an important proportion felt quite isolated from their friends", says FPCEUP.

Vaccination

Vaccine donations to former colonies 
Portugal announced that it would distribute 5% of its vaccine doses to a group of former colonies in Africa and to the nation of East Timor. Portugal is entitled to 35 million vaccine doses in 2021. Donating 5% of its stock means the country would give 1.75 million doses of the COVID-19 vaccine to Angola, Mozambique, Cape Verde, Guinea Bissau, Equatorial Guinea, São Tomé and Príncipe, and East Timor. So far, they have committed to donate 1 million doses starting in July 2021.

Statistics

See also 
 COVID-19 pandemic in Europe
 COVID-19 pandemic by country and territory

References

External links 

  (by the Directorate-General of Health)
 Ponto de Situação Atual em Portugal - Direção-Geral da Saúde
 Relatório de Situação - COVID-19 - Direção-Geral da Saúde
  (by the Portuguese government)
 Esri Portugal - Evolution of COVID-19 in Portugal with graphs and data
  
 Worldometers - Coronavirus (Covid-19 Data) - Portugal
 Repositório de dados Covid-19 em Portugal
 Vigilância da Mortalidade - Deaths statistics 
Ana P. Lemos-Paião, Cristiana J. Silva and Delfim F. M. Torres, A New Compartmental Epidemiological Model for COVID-19 with a Case Study of Portugal, Ecological Complexity 44 (2020) Art. 100885, 8 pp.
F. Ndairou, I. Area, J. J. Nieto, C. J. Silva and D. F. M. Torres, Fractional model of COVID-19 applied to Galicia, Spain and Portugal, Chaos Solitons Fractals 144 (2021), Art. 110652, 7 pp.
C.J. Silva, C. Cruz, D.F.M. Torres, A.P. Munuzuri, A. Carballosa, I. Area, J.J. Nieto, R. Fonseca-Pinto, R. Passadouro da Fonseca, E. Soares dos Santos, W. Abreu and J. Mira, Optimal control of the COVID-19 pandemic: controlled sanitary deconfinement in Portugal, Scientific Reports 11 (2021), Art. 3451, 15 pp.
 Wikiversity:COVID-19/All-cause deaths/Portugal

 
Portugal
Portugal
Disease outbreaks in Portugal
2020 in Portugal
2021 in Portugal